Hănăsenii Noi is a commune in Leova District, Moldova. It is composed of two villages, Hănăsenii Noi and Nicolaevca.

References

Communes of Leova District